Atriplex paludosa, commonly known as marsh saltbush, is a species of saltbush endemic to Australia.

Description
It grows as an erect shrub up to a metre high. Leaves are oval in shape, one to four centimetres long, and 2 to 15 millimetres wide.

Taxonomy
It was first published by Robert Brown in 1810 based on specimen material collected at Port Dalrymple, the site of present-day Launceston, Tasmania. Four subspecies are recognised: A. paludosa subsp. paludosa, A. paludosa subsp. baudinii, A. paludosa subsp. cordata and A. paludosa subsp. moquiniana.

Distribution and habitat
It occurs in southwestern Western Australia, South Australia, Victoria and coastal Tasmania.

References

paludosa
Caryophyllales of Australia
Flora of South Australia
Flora of Victoria (Australia)
Flora of Tasmania
Eudicots of Western Australia
Taxa named by Robert Brown (botanist, born 1773)
Plants described in 1810